Stanbrook is a surname. Notable people with the surname include:

Ivor Stanbrook (1924–2004), British politician
Roy Stanbrook (born 1957), Chief Executive of the Gibraltar Port Authority

See also
Stanbrook Abbey, former abbey in Worcestershire, England; community now moved to North Yorkshire